Double Rush is an American situation comedy that aired on CBS from January 4 to April 12, 1995. The series stars Robert Pastorelli as the manager of a bicycle messenger service in New York City.

Synopsis
As a young man in the 1960s, Johnny Verona had hoped to become a rock star. To earn the money he needed to buy a guitar previously owned by his idol, Jimi Hendrix, that he saw in a store window, he took a job as a bicycle messenger for Ed Foley Couriers. After buying the guitar, he joined a rock band in 1968 which enjoyed some success playing in clubs. When a record company offered him a solo contract in 1971, the idealistic Johnny turned it down because the contract did not include his fellow band members.

Denied his dream of being a rock music star, Johnny used the knowledge he had acquired as a bicycle courier to open his own bicycle delivery company in Manhattan. Called Double Rush, it offers a rush delivery service, guaranteeing delivery within 45 minutes, and a "double rush" service which promises delivery within 20 minutes. Johnny goes through ups and downs as he struggles to run the company in the face of competition from the increased use of fax machines and the Internet in the mid-1990s, as well as from his former employer Ed Foley Couriers, now run by Ed Foley and his daughter Kate. His young employees constantly remind Johnny of his missed chance to be a rock star in the 1970s, and he is prone to musing about it. A gruff but soft-hearted and fatherly man, he takes an interest in the personal lives and well-being of his employees at Double Rush.

Working for Johnny are the flighty, whiny, and neurotic Zoe Fuller, who could not find employment after graduating from Harvard Business School and during the first episode accepts a position as a bicycle messenger and bookkeeper with the company until she can find a better job; Barkley, the overqualified, cynical, spaced-out, wild-haired dispatcher, who wears extremely thick eyeglasses and dispenses philosophical advice as well as delivery assignments; Hunter, a dim-witted daredevil who takes great pleasure in speeding through Midtown Manhattan traffic on his bicycle and is the fastest courier at Double Rush; "The Kid," a 75-year-old prone to joking about his sex life and lack of direction in life who has 58 years of experience as a messenger, never uses a bicycle, and always delivers messages on foot, making up for his painful lack of physical speed by knowing every shortcut in New York City; and bicycle messengers Leo and Marlon. Leo, a former juvenile delinquent, is a naive, self-centered, morose, and cynical Generation Xer, while Marlon is a young husband and father who tries to balance his family life with his bicycle messenger job and has a knack for conning people.

Cast 
 Robert Pastorelli as Johnny Verona
 David Arquette as Hunter
 Corinne Bohrer as Zoe Fuller
 Adam Goldberg as Leo
 D.L. Hughley as Marlon
 Phil Leeds as "The Kid"
 Sam Lloyd as Barkley
 Richard Portnow as Ed Foley (recurring)
 Sarah Nelson as Kate Foley (recurring)

Production

After seven seasons portraying house painter Eldin Bernecky on Murphy Brown from 1988 to 1994, Robert Pastorelli left the series to star in his own show, Double Rush. Diane English and Stephen Nathan co-created the show, and were its executive producers. Michael Lembeck directed its episodes.

Reception

In a January 3, 1995, review in Variety, Todd Everett described Double Rush as an "amiable new sitcom" which lacked originality because of its obvious similarities to Taxi and Cheers, and which had a collection of characters familiar to television viewers; for example, he noted that the Zoe Fuller character bore a strong resemblance to Diane Chambers on Cheers. Everett described Lembeck as a canny director and the writing of the first episode as skillful in its development of characters without overcrowding the plot, but doubted Double Rush′s ability to succeed in the same time slot as ABC′s Roseanne.

On January 4, 1995, Scott D. Pierce wrote in the Deseret News that Double Rush was an obvious attempt to reach a Generation X audience that came across as a pale imitation of Taxi and was "lifeless," "strangely flat and unfunny." He described the actors as seeming to say their lines and wait for laughter rather than coming across as believable characters.

Writing in the Tampa Bay Times on January 4, 1995, Monica Yant described Double Rush as "equal parts MTV Sports and Taxi." She praised Pastorelli's portrayal of Eldin on Murphy Brown and expressed the opinion that Pastorelli could have succeeded in a starring vehicle of his own if it was a Murphy Brown spinoff centered around his Eldin character. She found Double Rush an odd way to give him his own show because, unlike Eldin, the Johnny Verona character had "about as much zest as dishwater" and did not allow Pastorelli to display his talents. Instead, she felt that Pastorelli failed to stand out among an ensemble cast that seemed able to carry the show without him.

Broadcast history

Double Rush premiered on January 4, 1995, airing on CBS on Wednesdays at 9:00 p.m. Eastern Time. Facing stiff competition in its time slot from ABC′s Roseanne, it drew low ratings, and after its fifth episode aired on February 1, 1995, it went into hiatus. It returned to the air with its sixth episode, broadcast on Monday, March 6, 1995, before settling two days later into its new time slot, Wednesdays at 8:30 p.m. Eastern Time. Ratings remained poor, and its run ended with its twelfth episode on April 12, 1995. Its thirteenth episode never aired as it was pre-empted for CBS News coverage of the Oklahoma City bombing.

Episodes
SOURCES

References

External links

Part One of Double Rush episode "The Episode Formerly Known as Prince" on YouTube
Part Two of Double Rush episode "The Episode Formerly Known as Prince" on YouTube
Part Three of Double Rush episode "The Episode Formerly Known as Prince" on YouTube

1990s American sitcoms
1995 American television series debuts
1995 American television series endings
CBS original programming
Television series by Warner Bros. Television Studios
Television series created by Diane English
Television shows set in New York City
Latino sitcoms